"Trouble Is a Friend" is a song by Australian recording artist and actress Lenka from her debut studio album, Lenka (2008). It was released on 1 September 2009 as the album's second and final single. The song was written by Thomas Salter and Lenka. It was used in an episode from the fifth season of the popular medical drama Grey's Anatomy, teen drama television series 90210 and in the 2010 film Easy A.

Music video
The official music video for "Trouble Is a Friend" shows Lenka making her way towards the screen. As the video progresses, her dresses and the backgrounds start to change in the verses. At times Lenka interacts with the newly found backgrounds and illustrations. The music video ends with the camera closing up on Lenka then fading out to a dark screen.

Another video, made by Lenka and James Gulliver Hancock, is a shadow figure production that follows a girl and her Trouble, in the form of a dragon. The video ends with the girl getting into a hot air balloon and suffering a terrible fate.

Live performances 
Lenka performed the song on the 3 May 2013 episode of X Factor Indonesia.

Track listing
 "Trouble Is a Friend (Spike Stent Remix)" – 3:29

Charts

References

2009 singles
Lenka songs
2009 songs
Song recordings produced by Mike Elizondo
Epic Records singles
Songs written by Tawgs Salter